This is a list of Punjabi cinema actors.

 Aarya Babbar
 Aman Dhaliwal
 Amberdeep Singh
 Ammy Virk
 Amrinder Gill
 Amrish Puri
 Amrit Maan
 Arjan Bajwa
 Arun Bakshi
 Avtar Gill
 Baldev Khosa
 B.N. Sharma
 Birbal Actor 
 Babbal Rai
 Babbu Maan
 Balraj Sahni
 Chaman Puri
 David Abraham Cheulkar
 D. K. Sapru
 Binnu Dhillon
 Dakssh Ajit Singh
 Dara Singh
 Deep Dhillon
 Deep Sidhu
 Dev Kharoud
 Dheeraj Kumar
 Diljit Dosanjh
 Garry Sandhu
 Gavie Chahal
 Gippy Grewal
 Gugu Gill
 Mahie Gill
 Gurcharan Pohli
 Gulzar Inder Chahal
 Gurdas Maan
 Gurkirtan Chauhan
 Gurnam Bhullar
 Gurpreet Ghuggi
 Gurshabad
 I.S Johar
 Harbhajan Mann
 Hardy Sandhu
 Harish Verma
 Harp Farmer
 Jackie Shroff
 Johnny Walker
 Jagdish Raj
 Jaggi Singh
 Jaspal Bhatti
 Jass Bajwa
 Jassi Gill
 Jaswinder Bhalla
 Jazzy B
 Jeevan
 Jimmy Shergill
 Kanwaljit Singh
 Karamjit Anmol
 Karan Kundra
 Kavita Kaushik
 Kulbhushan Kharbanda
 Lakha Lakhwinder Singh
 Madan Puri
 Manmohan Krishan
 Majnu
 Mahendra Sandhu
 Mangal Dhillon
 Mehar Mittal
 Moolchand
 Muhammad Sadiq
 Mukesh Rishi
 Mukesh Tiwari
 Murad
 Nav Bajwa
 Navraj Hans
 Ninja (singer)
 Neeru Bajwa
 Om Prakash
 Om Puri
 Parmish Verma
 Pran
 Prem Chopra
 Prithviraj Kapoor
 Ravindra Kapoor
 Raza Murad
 Rahul Dev
 Raj Babbar
 Raj Brar
 Rana Ranbir
 Randhir
 Ranjeet
 Ranjit Bawa
 Ram Mohan
 Ravinder Grewal
 Roshan Prince
 Shatrughan Sinha
 Samuel John
 Sarbjit Cheema
 Sardar Sohi
 Sardool Sikander
 Satish Kaul
 Sharat Saxena
 Sharry Mann
 Shashi Puri
 Shavinder Mahal
 Simi Chahal
 Sohail Ahmed
 Suresh
 Sudesh Lehri
 Sunder
 Sunil Dutt
 Surinder Shinda
 Tania
 Tarsem Jassar
 Tiger Joginder Singh
 Trilok Kapoor
 Veerendra
 Vishal Karwal
 Vivaan Arora
 Vivek Shauq
 Yograj Singh
 Yuvraj Hans

See also 
List of Punjabi cinema actresses

Cinema of Punjab
list